Khalikeyevo (Xälekäy) is a rural locality (a selo) and the administrative centre of Khalikeyevsky Selsoviet, Sterlibashevsky District, Bashkortostan, Russia. The population was 350 as of 2010. There are 7 streets.

Geography 
Khalikeyevo is located 8 km south of Sterlibashevo (the district's administrative centre) by road. Sary-Yelga is the nearest rural locality.

References 

Rural localities in Sterlibashevsky District